The 2017 Total Spa 24 Hours was the 69th running of the Spa 24 Hours. It was also the fourth round of the 2017 Blancpain GT Series Endurance Cup and was held on 29 and 30 July at the Circuit de Spa-Francorchamps, Belgium.

The race was won by  Audi Sport Team Saintéloc and drivers Christopher Haase, Jules Gounon and Markus Winkelhock.

Race result

References

Spa 24 Hours
Spa
Spa
24 Hours of Spa
24